Tibor Zsitvay de Zsitvatő (10 November 1884 – 9 July 1969) was a Hungarian politician and jurist, who served as Minister of Justice between 1929 and 1932. He finished law studies at the University of Budapest. He was the counsel of the Hungarian Railways from 1909 to 1919. After the fall of the Hungarian Soviet Republic he was one of the founders of the Christian National Party. He was delegated to the position of commissioner of Kecskemét between 1919 and 1920. He left his party in 1920 and became lawyer again.

He worked as the attorney general of the MÁV in 1920–26. He became a member of the Diet of Hungary in 1922 and served as Deputy Speaker in 1924. He served as Speaker of the National Assembly of Hungary between 1926 and 1929. After that he was appointed Minister of Justice by István Bethlen. Zsitvay held the position in the cabinet of Gyula Károlyi too. During his ministership, the two communist leaders, Sándor Fürst and Imre Sallai were executed. He represented Kecskemét from 1931. He was the leader of the Party of National Unity in Budapest during this time. He left the governing party in 1938. He emigrated to Switzerland in 1944.

References
 Magyar Életrajzi Lexikon

External links
 

|-

1884 births
1969 deaths
Politicians from Bratislava
People from the Kingdom of Hungary
Justice ministers of Hungary
Speakers of the National Assembly of Hungary
Speakers of the House of Representatives of Hungary
Eötvös Loránd University alumni
Hungarian emigrants to Switzerland